Zeyl (also Romanized as Z̄eyl, Zīyel, and 'Z̄a’īl; also known as Z̄eyl Omm oş Şakhar) is a village in Jaffal Rural District, in the Central District of Shadegan County, Khuzestan Province, Iran. At the 2006 census, its population was 100, in 19 families.

References 

Populated places in Shadegan County